Hard as Nails is a 2003 novel by American writer Dan Simmons. It is the third of three hardboiled detective novels featuring the character of Joe Kurtz. The premise of the book is as follows:Somewhere in Western New York, there's a remote mountaintop in the moonlight, its dark forests and moon-dappled meadows populated only by corpses. If ex-PI Joe Kurtz doesn't unravel the secret of that place in five days, he'll be one of them.

References 

2003 novels